Onkgopotse Tiro (9 November 1945 – 1 February 1974) was a South African student activist and black consciousness militant. He was born in Dinokana, a small village near Zeerust. He was expelled from the University of the North (now known as University of Limpopo) in 1972 for his political activities. At university he had become an active member of the South African Student Organisation, out of which the Black Consciousness Movement grew.

After his expulsion from the then University of the North in 1972, following his scathing critique of the Bantu Education Act of 1953, he went on to teach history at Morris Isaacson High School near and around Central Western Jabavu (CWJ) in Soweto in 1973. Tsietsi Mashinini, who was an integral part of the 1976 student uprising, was one the students during the time he taught at Morris Isaacson, and many of his students have recalled his impact on their own politicisation during this period of student organisation in South African history.<ref name="Glaser, Bo-Tsotsi: The Youth Gangs of Soweto, 1935-1976" /

Death

Tiro was killed by a parcel bomb in Botswana in 1974.

References

External links

Abram Ramothibi Onkgopotse Tiro, SA History Online

1974 deaths
Extrajudicial killings
South African activists
Anti-apartheid activists
1947 births
People from Ramotshere Moiloa Local Municipality
Deaths by letter bomb